Charles Lambert Marie Joseph Manneback (born 9 March 1894 in Etterbeek, Belgium; died 15 December 1975 in Etterbeek) was a Belgian physicist, mining engineer, and mathematician.

After serving in the Belgian army during World War I, he obtained a civil engineering diploma from the Catholic University of Leuven in 1920.

He then left to the United States as an exchange fellow, where he obtained an M.A. degree from the Massachusetts Institute of Technology, and in 1922 a Ph.D. degree in electrical engineering. His dissertation was advised by V. Bush and had a subject from the theory of electromagnetic waves and the skin effect.

He was a professor at the Catholic University of Leuven, and a member of the Royal Academies for Science and the Arts of Belgium.

References

Marc de Hemptinne, Maurice A. Biot, "Notice sur Charles Manneback", in Charles Lambert Manneback, 1978, pp. 1–28
Pierre Marage, "La physique nucléaire et la physique des particules élémentaires", in Histoire des sciences en Belgique, 1815–2000 sous la dir. De Robert Halleux, vol. 2, Bruxelles, Dexia/La Renaissance du Livre, 2001, p. 2
Patricia Radelet, "Charles Manneback 9 mars 1894 – 15 décembre 1975, les débuts de la mécanique ondulatoire,", in Revue des Questions Scientifiques, t. 161, 1990, pp. 289–308
Geert Vanpaemel, "La révolution darwinienne", in Histoire des sciences en Belgique, 1815–2000 sous la dir. De Robert Halleux, vol. 1, Bruxelles, Dexia/La Renaissance du Livre, 2001 p. 142

External links

1894 births
1975 deaths
Belgian physicists
20th-century Belgian mathematicians
20th-century Belgian engineers
Belgian electrical engineers
Catholic University of Leuven (1834–1968) alumni
MIT School of Engineering alumni
Academic staff of the Catholic University of Leuven (1834–1968)
Members of the Royal Academy of Belgium